John William Ronald Ilangakoon, KC (16 August 1894 - 1982) was a Ceylonese lawyer. He was the 25th Attorney General of Ceylon and 11th Solicitor General of Ceylon.

Having qualified as a barrister, he became an advocate. In 1928 he was appointed a District Judge and in 1935 he was appointed Solicitor General succeeding L. M. D. de Silva. He was succeeded by Arthur Wijewardena and was appointed King's Counsel in 1936. He was appointed Attorney General on 1 October 1936, succeeding John Curtois Howard, and held the office until 1942. He was succeeded by Manikku Wadumestri Hendrick de Silva. He was the first Sinhalese to hold the office of Attorney General.

He married Annette Lena Dias Bandaranaike daughter of Justice Felix Reginald Dias Bandaranaike I on 10 October 1914. His brother S. W. Illangakoon was the Mudaliyar of Colombo.

References

Attorneys General of British Ceylon
Solicitors General of Ceylon
20th-century King's Counsel
Ceylonese Queen's Counsel
Ceylonese advocates
Sinhalese lawyers
1894 births
1982 deaths
People from British Ceylon